This article provides a summary of results for the general elections to the Canadian province of Nova Scotias unicameral legislative body, the Nova Scotia House of Assembly. The number of seats has varied over time, from a low of thirty during the 1930s and early 1940s, to the current high of fifty-two. This article only covers elections since Nova Scotia became part of the newly formed Canadian Confederation in 1867. Prior to that, Nova Scotia was a British colony. The Nova Scotia House of Assembly dates back to 1758, and Nova Scotia became the first British colony to be granted responsible government from London in 1848.

The chart on the upper right provides a graphical summary of the results, with the most recent elections towards the right. It shows how the Liberal party (red) dominated the province's early political history, winning nineteen of the first twenty-two elections from 1867 to 1953; and that since 1953, the Conservatives (blue) have been the most successful party, winning eleven of the fifteen elections since then. The New Democratic Party (orange), after winning Official Opposition status in four consecutive elections, finally achieved government for the first time in the 2009 election.

Summary of results
The table below shows the total number of seats won by the major political parties at each election. It also shows the percentage of the vote obtained by the major political parties at each election, if greater than 0.1%. The winning party's totals are shown in bold. To date, no party has formed a government that did not have the largest share of the vote. Full details on any election are linked via the number of the election at the start of the row.

Notes
 Includes results for Progressive Conservatives.
 Includes results for Co-operative Commonwealth Federation prior to 1963; and also results for the Labour party prior to 1937.
 Includes Pro Confederation.
 Includes Anti-Confederates.
 Includes 2.0% for Cape Breton Labour Party.

See also
Timeline of Canadian elections
List of political parties in Nova Scotia

References
 

 
Nova Scotia General Elections
Elections, general